1969 Academy Awards may refer to:

 41st Academy Awards, the Academy Awards ceremony that took place in 1969
 42nd Academy Awards, the 1970 ceremony honoring the best in film for 1969